Peter Ah-Ming Koo (born September 5, 1952) was a Chinese American politician who represented the 20th district of the New York City Council from 2010 to 2021. He is a Democrat. The district includes portions of Bayside, College Point, Flushing, Flushing Meadows Corona Park, Fresh Meadows and Whitestone in Queens.

Koo and Manhattan Council member Margaret Chin comprise the Asian-American delegation of the council.

Life and career
Koo is a Chinese American born in Shanghai in 1952.  Prior to immigrating to the United States in 1971, he lived in the former British Hong Kong.  Graduating from the University of New Mexico College of Pharmacy in 1975 where he paid his way through by working minimum wage jobs at Kentucky Fried Chicken and Dunkin Donuts, Koo is a pharmacist who developed a five-store chain of pharmacies called Starside Drugs Pharmacy.

He has been a member of Queens Community Board 7. Previously, he unsuccessfully challenged local state senator Toby Ann Stavisky in 2008. He has been called the "Mayor" of Flushing.

In January 2012, Koo changed his party affiliation from Republican to Democratic.

New York City Council
Koo was elected to the city council seat on November 3, 2009, defeating Democratic Party nominee Yen Chou, Working Families Party nominee S.J. Jung, and Green Party nominee Evergreen Chou.  He assumed the position that was held by John Liu, the New York City Comptroller. He was term limited out of office at the end of 2021.

Koo serves on the following New York City Council committees:

 Consumer Affairs and Business Licensing
 Economic Development
 Land Use
 Landmarks, Public Siting, and Maritime Uses (subcommittee of Land Use Committee)
 Parks and Recreation
 Technology (He serves as chair of this committee.)
 Transportation

Caucuses
Black, Latino/a, and Asian Caucus

Personal life
Peter has been married for 26 years and has two children, a boy and a girl.

See also
 Hong Kong Americans in New York City

References

External links
 Councilman Peter Koo (official site)
@CMPeterKoo (official Twitter)
Re-elect Peter Koo for City Council (campaign site)

1952 births
21st-century American politicians
American businesspeople in retailing
American politicians of Chinese descent
Asian-American New York City Council members
Asian-American people in New York (state) politics
Businesspeople in the pharmaceutical industry
Chinese emigrants to the United States
Living people
Businesspeople from New York (state)
New York (state) Democrats
New York (state) Republicans
New York City Council members
People from Queens, New York
Pharmacists from New York City
Politicians from Shanghai
University of New Mexico alumni